Bernard Cyril Eeles (1913-1961) was a male athlete who competed for England.

Athletics career
Eeles represented England in the 880 yards and 1 mile at the 1938 British Empire Games in Sydney, New South Wales, Australia.

Personal life
Eeles was a by accountant by trade and lived in Cecil Avenue, in Enfield during 1938.

References

1913 births
1961 deaths
English male middle-distance runners
Athletes (track and field) at the 1938 British Empire Games
Commonwealth Games competitors for England